Samuel Maxwell McCready (8 March 1918 – 1994) was an Irish amateur golfer. He won the 1949 Amateur Championship and was in the British Walker Cup team in 1949 and 1951.

McCready lived near the Dunmurry golf course, near Belfast, where he learnt his golf. During World War II he served in the Royal Air Force. McCready moved to South Africa in 1959 where he worked for McAlpine Construction. He died in South Africa in 1994. His widow Joan died in 2015 at the age of 109.

Amateur wins

1947 RAF Championship
1948 Jamaican Amateur Championship
1949 The Amateur Championship

Major championships

Wins (1)

Team appearances
Walker Cup (representing Great Britain): 1949, 1951

References

Male golfers from Northern Ireland
Amateur golfers
Royal Air Force personnel of World War II
Irish emigrants to South Africa
Sportspeople from Belfast
1918 births
1994 deaths